Asiman Gurbanli (born 10 August 1992) is an Azerbaijani karateka. He won the gold medal in the men's kumite +84 kg event at the 2019 European Games held in Minsk, Belarus.

Career 

In 2017, he won one of the bronze medals in the men's kumite +84 kg event at the Islamic Solidarity Games held in Baku, Azerbaijan. At the 2019 European Karate Championships held in Guadalajara, Spain, he won one of the bronze medals in the men's kumite +84 kg event.

In June 2021, he competed at the World Olympic Qualification Tournament held in Paris, France hoping to qualify for the 2020 Summer Olympics in Tokyo, Japan. In November 2021, he won one of the bronze medals in the men's +84 kg event at the World Karate Championships held in Dubai, United Arab Emirates.

He competed in the men's kumite +84 kg event at the 2022 World Games held in Birmingham, United States. He won the silver medal in the men's +84 kg event at the 2021 Islamic Solidarity Games held in Konya, Turkey.

Achievements

References

External links 

 
 

Living people
1992 births
Place of birth missing (living people)
Azerbaijani male karateka
European Games gold medalists for Azerbaijan
Karateka at the 2019 European Games
European Games medalists in karate
Islamic Solidarity Games medalists in karate
Islamic Solidarity Games competitors for Azerbaijan
Competitors at the 2022 World Games
21st-century Azerbaijani people